Danny Jones (born October 24, 1968) is a retired American professional basketball player.

Career
He was a standout for the University of Wisconsin but was never drafted to the National Basketball Association (NBA). Instead, he played for the Rockford Lightning during the 1990–91 Continental Basketball Association season where he averaged 12.2 points and 4.3 rebounds in 24 games. The following season, he played for the La Crosse Catbirds that won the league championship.

From there, Jones proceeded to the World Basketball League where he suited up for Erie Wave and normed 20.6 points per game. Initially, out of college, he saw action for Efes Pilsen in Turkey, and then went to the Philippines to play for Ginebra San Miguel in the Philippine Basketball Association.

He won back-to-back Circuito Mexicano de Básquetbol (CIMEBA) titles with the Soles de Jalisco.

References

External links
Wisconsin Hall of Fame profile
College statistics

1968 births
Living people
American expatriate basketball people in Belgium
American expatriate basketball people in Canada
American expatriate basketball people in Cyprus
American expatriate basketball people in Hong Kong
American expatriate basketball people in Japan
American expatriate basketball people in Mexico
American expatriate basketball people in Portugal
American expatriate basketball people in the Philippines
American expatriate basketball people in Turkey
Basketball players from Wisconsin
Forwards (basketball)
La Crosse Bobcats players
La Crosse Catbirds players
Philippine Basketball Association imports
Pittsburgh Piranhas players
Rockford Lightning players
Soles de Jalisco players
Sportspeople from Aurora, Illinois
Wisconsin Badgers men's basketball players
American men's basketball players
Barangay Ginebra San Miguel players